Dowpar-e Qabr-e Kiamars (also Romanized as Dowpar-e Qabr-e Kīāmars̱; also known as Do Par and Dowpar-e Qabr) is a village in Dehdasht-e Gharbi Rural District, in the Central District of Kohgiluyeh County, Kohgiluyeh and Boyer-Ahmad Province, Iran. At the 2006 census, its population was 38, in 7 families.

References 

Populated places in Kohgiluyeh County